The list of shipwrecks in 1976 includes ships sunk, foundered, grounded, or otherwise lost during 1976.

January

3 January

8 January

10 January

19 January

26 January

Unknown date

February

11 February

15 February

20 February

22 February

26 February

March

1 March

4 March

23 March

April

5 April

6 April

8 April

14 April

16 April

26 April

May

2 May

12 May

13 May

June

10 June

23 June

23 June

Unknown date

July

3 July

21 July

25 July

Unknown date

August

3 August

10 August

12 August

16 August

20 August

24 August

26 August

31 August

Unknown date

September

17 September

18 September

20 September

22 September

26 September

27 September

29 September

October

9 October

12 October

14 October

15 October

18 October

20 October

23 October

25 October

27 October

Unknown date

November

1 November

22 November

27 November

December

3 December

9 December

11 December

15 December

17 December

20 December

23 December

24 December

27 December

Unknown date

Unknown date

References

1976
 
Ships